Gill is an unincorporated community and a U.S. Post Office in Weld County, Colorado, United States.  The Gill Post Office has the ZIP Code 80624.

A post office called Gill has been in operation since 1910. The community has the name of William H Gill, an early landowner.

Geography
Gill is located at  (40.454001,-104.541779).

References

Unincorporated communities in Colorado
Unincorporated communities in Weld County, Colorado